PJSC Central Telegraph is a Russian telecommunications company which provides different services such as fixed line telephony and internet access, IPTV, rental of communication channels, electrical documentation, integrated business solutions such as IP PBX and video surveillance. The company is active mainly in Moscow. It is owned 100% by Rostelecom.

History
Central Telegraph dates back to October 1, 1852 - the date of establishment of the first telegraph station in Moscow in the station building Petersburg-Moscow railway.

Since 1870, the telegraph station at Myasnitskaya Ulitsa became known as the Moscow telegraph station (with respect to opening the city's cable station, the number of which reached 33 by 1880).

In 1998 the company began a project to create a digital transport network, which has become the technology platform for the development of communication services "Central Telegraph". Under this project, the company has been allocated resource numbering capacity to connect subscribers: 213.5 thousand telephone numbers in the code "095", which was replaced by the code "495", 50 thousand rooms - in the code "499" in Moscow, and also 100 thousand numbers in the code "498" in the Moscow region. In 1999 the company began providing digital telephone services to subscribers in Moscow.

References

External links
 

Companies based in Moscow
Telecommunications companies established in 1852
Telecommunications companies of Russia
1852 establishments in the Russian Empire
Russian brands
Rostelecom
Companies listed on the Moscow Exchange